The Mark of Cain mainly refers to the Curse and mark of Cain from the Bible.

Mark of Cain may also refer to:
 The Mark of Cain (band), an Australian band
 The Mark of Cain (1916 film), an American silent film starring Lon Chaney, Sr.
 The Mark of Cain (1917 film), an American silent mystery film directed by George Fitzmaurice
 The Mark of Cain (1947 film), a British film directed by Brian Desmond Hurt
 The Mark of Cain (2000 film), a documentary by Alix Lambert on Russian criminal tattoos
 The Mark of Cain (2007 film), a television film by Channel 4
 Mark of Cain (novel), a novel by Israeli author Ram Oren
 "Mark of Cain", a song by Therion from the album Crowning of Atlantis